Ayman Mansour أيمن منصور (born 9 September 1963) is an Egyptian former footballer who played as a forward, most notably for Zamalek. Mansour played for the Egypt national team, including at the 1994 African Cup of Nations.

Club career 
Mansour was called "Super" after scoring the winning goal against Al Ahly club in the 1994 CAF Super Cup.

He retired following the 1996 season due to back problems.

International career 
Mansour appeard in 34 matches for the Egypt national team scoring 9 goals. He won gold with Egypt during the 1992 Pan Arab Games, which also counted as the 1992 Arab Cup. He scored the fastest goal in the African Cup of nations History vs. Gabon, 1994, after 23 seconds of play.

Honours

Player
Zamalek
2 Egyptian Premier League titles
2 CAF Champions League titles
2 African Super Cup titles

Assistant manager
Zamalek
1 Egyptian league (2003/2004)
1 Arab Club Championship (2003)
1 Egyptian Saudi Super Cup (2003)

References

Living people
1963 births
Egyptian footballers
Association football forwards
Egypt international footballers
1994 African Cup of Nations players
Egyptian Premier League players
Zamalek SC players
Egyptian football managers
Zamalek SC managers
Al Kharaitiyat SC managers
Egyptian expatriate football managers